Agaronia biraghii is a species of sea snail, a marine gastropod mollusk in the family Olividae, the olive shells.

Description
The holotype of the species measures around 6.1 centimeters (2.4 inches) in length. A. biraghii exhibits predatory behaviour.

Distribution
A. biraghii has been documented to appear along the Gulf of Guinea, including in the Komo River estuary of Gabon and on the coast of Pointe-Noire, Republic of Congo.

References

Olividae
Gastropods described in 1984